Prostanthera grylloana is a species of flowering plant in the family Lamiaceae and is endemic to Western Australia. It is a small, erect shrub with densely hairy branchlets, small, spatula-shaped leaves and red to pink flowers.

Description
Both the petiole and leaf blade have a longitudinal groove so that the two sides of the leaves almost touch. Flowering occurs in February, May or from September to December.

Taxonomy
Prostanthera grylloana was first formally described in 1876 by Ferdinand von Mueller in his book Fragmenta phytographiae Australiae from specimens collected "in the desert around Ularing" by Jess Young. The specific epithet (grylloana) honours the actress Adelaide Ristori, the wife of the marchese Giuliano Capranica del Grillo.

Distribution and habitat
This mintbush grows on granite outcrops and ridges and on stony hills and undulating plains in the Avon Wheatbelt, Coolgardie, Mallee and Murchison biographic regions of Western Australia.

Conservation status
Prostanthera grylloana is classified as "not threatened" by the Western Australian Government Department of Parks and Wildlife.

References

grylloana
Flora of Western Australia
Lamiales of Australia
Taxa named by Ferdinand von Mueller
Plants described in 1876